The 2021 Mid-American Conference men's soccer tournament was the postseason women's soccer tournament for the Mid-American Conference held from November 11 through November 14, 2021. The tournament took place at the NIU Soccer Complex in DeKalb, Illinois, home of the Northern Illinois Huskies, the regular season conference champions. The four-team single-elimination tournament consisted of two rounds based on seeding from regular season conference play. The West Virginia were the defending champions after having won the title in 2019. There was no tournament in 2020 due to the COVID-19 pandemic, so the 2019 champions were considered the defending champions. The title was the third for the Northern Illinois men's soccer program and the first of which came under head coach Ryan Swan. As tournament champions, Northern Illinois earned the Mid-American's automatic berth into the 2021 NCAA Division I men's soccer tournament.

Seeding 
Four of the seven Mid-American men's soccer programs qualified for the 2021 Tournament. Teams were seeded based on their regular season records. Tiebreakers were used to determine the seedings of teams who finished with identical conference records.  No tiebreakers were required as each of the top four teams finished with unique records.

Bracket

Source:

Schedule

Semifinals

Final

Statistics

Goalscorers

All-Tournament team

Source:

MVP in bold

References 

Mid-American Conference Men's Soccer Tournament
2021 Mid-American Conference men's soccer season